The 13th Cannes Film Festival was held from 4 to 20 May 1960. The Palme d'Or went to the La Dolce Vita by Federico Fellini. The festival opened with Ben-Hur, directed by William Wyler.

Jury
The following people were appointed as the Jury of the 1960 competition:

Feature films
Georges Simenon (Belgium) Jury President
Marc Allégret (France)
Louis Chauvet (France) (journalist)
Diego Fabbri (Italy)
Hidemi Ima (Japan)
Grigori Kozintsev (Soviet Union)
Maurice Leroux (France)
Max Lippmann (West Germany) (critic)
Henry Miller (USA)
Simone Renant (France)
Ulises Petit de Murat (Argentina)
Short films
Georges Altman (France) (journalist)
Nicolas Hayer (France)
Henri Storck (Belgium)
Jean Vivie (France) (CST official)
Dušan Vukotić (Yugoslavia)

Feature film competition
The following feature films competed for the Palme d'Or:

America As Seen by a Frenchman (L'Amérique insolite) by François Reichenbach
L'avventura by Michelangelo Antonioni
Bad Luck (Zezowate szczęście) by Andrzej Munk
Ballad of a Soldier (Ballada o soldate) by Grigori Chukhrai
The Chasers (Jakten) by Erik Løchen
Cidade Ameaçada by Roberto Farias
The Delinquents (Los golfos) by Carlos Saura
La Dolce Vita by Federico Fellini
The Enchanting Shadow (Ching nu yu hun) by Li Han Hsiang
First Lesson (Parvi urok) by Rangel Vulchanov
The Hole (Le Trou) by Jacques Becker
Home from the Hill by Vincente Minnelli
If the Wind Frightens You (Si le vent te fait peur) by Emile Degelin
The Lady with the Dog (Dama s sobachkoy) by Iosif Kheifits
Macario by Roberto Gavaldón
Never on Sunday (Pote tin Kyriaki) by Jules Dassin
The Ninth Circle (Deveti krug) by France Štiglic
Odd Obsession (Kagi) by Kon Ichikawa
Paw(also known as Boy of Two Worlds) by Astrid Henning-Jensen
La Procesión by Francis Lauric
The Savage Innocents by Nicholas Ray and Baccio Bandini
Seven Days... Seven Nights (Moderato Cantabile) by Peter Brook
Sons and Lovers by Jack Cardiff
Sujata by Bimal Roy
Telegrame by Gheorghe Naghi and Aurel Miheles
The Unsent Letter (Neotpravlennoye pismo) by Mikhail Kalatozov
The Virgin Spring (Jungfrukällan) by Ingmar Bergman
When the Woman Butts In (Kam čert nemůže) by Zdeněk Podskalský
The Young One by Luis Buñuel

Films out of competition
The following films were selected to be screened out of competition:
 Ben-Hur by William Wyler
 Orient-Occident by Enrico Fulchignoni

Short film competition
The following short films competed for the Short Film Palme d'Or:

 Aux confins des deux continents by Emlak Kredi Bankasi
 La ballata del Monte Bianco by Luciano Ricci
 The Blue of the Sky by John Ralmon
 Le brise glace atomique Lenine by Nicholas Tcherskov
 A City Called Copenhagen by Jørgen Roos
 Dagen mijner jaren by Max De Haas
 De Dragul Printesei by Ion Popescu-Gopo
 Enfants des courants d'air by Edouard Luntz
 Fiesta en Xochimilco by Fernando Martinez Alvarez
 Fitz-Roy by Humberto Peruzzi
 Franz Hellens ou documents secrets by Lucien Deroisy
 In Search of Lincoln by Carlisle, Dunphy, Wondsel
 Le journal d'un certain David by Pierre Jallaud, Sylvie Jallaud
 Mali voz by Branislas Bastac
 Materia e forma by Fulvio Tului
 Orff-Schulwerk - Rhythmisch-Melodische Erziehung by Hans Rolf Strobel, Heinz Tichawsky
 Paris la belle by Pierre Prévert
 Perfecto luna by Archibaldo Burns
 Le pilote m'a dit by Niklaus Gessner
 Pozor by Jiří Brdečka
 Promethee by Todor Dinov
 Die Purpulinie by K.L. Ruppel
 Ragadozo novenyek by Ágoston Kollányi
 Roman mosaics in Anatolia by M.S. Ipsiroglu
 Shringar by RavI Prakash
 Sorolla, pintor de la luz by Manuel Dominguez
 Le sourire by Serge Bourguignon
 Universe by Roman Kroitor
 Uwaga diabeł by Zenon Wasilewski
 Les Alpinistes de la Mer (De Wadlopers) by Emile Van Moerkerken
 Winter Quarters by John P. Taylor

Awards

Official awards
The following films and people received the 1960 awards:
Palme d'Or: La Dolce Vita by Federico Fellini
Jury Prize:
L'avventura by Michelangelo Antonioni
Odd Obsession (Kagi) by Kon Ichikawa
Best Actress:
Jeanne Moreau for Seven Days... Seven Nights (Moderato Cantabile)
Melina Mercouri for Never on Sunday (Pote tin Kyriaki)
Best participation:
The Lady with the Dog (Dama s sobachkoy) by Iosif Kheifits
Ballad of a Soldier (Ballada o soldate) by Grigori Chukhrai
Short films
Short Film Palme d'Or: Le sourire by Serge Bourguignon
 Short Film Jury Prize: 
Paris la belle by Pierre Prévert
A City Called Copenhagen by Jørgen Roos
Universe (French version: Notre univers) by Roman Kroitor
Special Mention - Short Film: Dagen mijner jaren by Max De Haas

Independent awards
FIPRESCI
 FIPRESCI Prize: The Virgin Spring (Jungfrukällan) by Ingmar Bergman
OCIC Award
 Paw by Astrid Henning-Jensen
Other awards
Special Mention:
The Virgin Spring (Jungfrukällan) by Ingmar Bergman
The Young One by Luis Buñuel

References

Media

British Pathé: Cannes Film Festival 1960 footage
Institut National de l'Audiovisuel: Cannes Festival (commentary in French)
INA: Dolce Vita night at the 1960 Festival (commentary in French)
INA: List of winners of the 1960 Cannes Festival (commentary in French)
INA: Opening of the Cannes Film Festival (commentary in French)

External links 
1960 Cannes Film Festival (web.archive)
Official website Retrospective 1960 
Cannes Film Festival Awards for 1960 at Internet Movie Database

Cannes Film Festival, 1960
Cannes Film Festival, 1960
Cannes Film Festival